Events from the year 1342 in Ireland.

Incumbent
Lord: Edward III

Events

 King Conchobhar of Tír Conaill is killed and succeeded by his brother, Niall.
 Soldiers from Ireland are sent to campaign for Edward III in Brittany.
 January 16 – May 18 Deputy justiciar John Morice campaigns against the Irish of Mide.
 April 5 – 4th Earl of Kildare is granted livery of his lands.
 after July 1 
 King Toirdhealbhacf Connacht restores Roscommon castle to William de Bermingham, the royal constable.
 July 16 – September 4 – Deputy justiciar campaigns in Wicklow against the Ó Broin.
 November 4 – King Toirdhealbhach of Connacht is deposed by Mac Diarmata (Eng. MacDermot) and Mac William Burke. Succeeded by Aodh mac Aodh of Clann Mhuircheartaigh.

Births

Deaths

References

Notes

"A New History of Ireland VIII: A Chronology of Irish History to 1976", edited by T. W. Moody, F.X. Martin and F.J. Byrne. Oxford, 1982. .
Annala Uladh: Annals of Ulster otherwise Annala Senait, Annals of Senat
Annals of the Four Masters
Annals of Loch Cé

 
1340s in Ireland
Ireland
Years of the 14th century in Ireland